Özcan Yeniçeri (born in 1 January 1954), is a Turkish politician and academic who had been a member of the Grand National Assembly from 2011 to 2015.

References

1954 births
Living people